Nicole Pitts (born November 3, 1986) is an American former professional tennis player.

Pitts, a Junior Orange Bowl (14s) champion in 2000, turned professional as a teenager. She made a WTA Tour main draw appearance at the 2002 Kroger St. Jude International in Memphis, where she was beaten in the first round by the ninth-seeded Irina Selyutina. With a wrist injury ending her career early, Pitts attended medical school in Tennessee and now works as a pediatric sports medicine physician.

Personal life
Pitts is a half sister of tennis players Hurricane Tyra Black and Tornado Alicia Black, from her mother Gayal's marriage to their father Sylvester "Sly" Black, a former hitting coach of Nicole.

References

External links
 
 

1986 births
Living people
American female tennis players
Tennis people from Florida